Keddie may refer to: 

Keddie, California, U.S.
Keddies, a British department store chain

People with the surname
Alex Keddie (born 1981), Scottish footballer
Asher Keddie (born 1974), Australian actress
Bob Keddie (born 1946), Australian rules footballer
Gail Keddie (born c.1955), British competitive figure skater
Henrietta Keddie (1827–1914), Scottish novelist
Jack Keddie (1922–1945), Australian rules footballer
Jim Keddie (1906–1984), Australian rules footballer 
Nikki Keddie (born 1930), American professor of Eastern, Iranian, and women's history

See also
Keddy (disambiguation)
Keedy (disambiguation)
Kiddie (disambiguation)